Greg Faull (born 26 February 1969) is a former Australian rules footballer who played with Collingwood in the Victorian Football League (VFL).

Faull came to Collingwood from the Mininera & District Football League's SMW Rovers.

He made one senior appearance for Collingwood in the 1987 VFL season, their 23-point win over the Brisbane Bears at Carrara Oval.

References

External links
 
 

1969 births
Australian rules footballers from Victoria (Australia)
Collingwood Football Club players
Living people